Sir Thomas Alexander Crispin Leech, styled Mr Justice Leech, is a British High Court judge.

Early life 
Leech was born in London and brought up in Kirkby Lonsdale, Cumbria where he attended the local state grammar school.

He went on to study Classics and Law at the University of Oxford , graduating in 1986. He continued his studies and later completed a post graduate degree, Bachelor of Civil Law.

Legal career 
In 1988 Leech was called to the Bar by Middle Temple and joined Maitland Chambers.

Leech was appointed King's Counsel in 2010.

In 2014, Leech became a partner in the Advocacy Team at Herbert Smith Freehills.

Leech is one of the authors for a Law Textbook titled 'Flenley & Leech on Solicitors’ Negligence' and a co-editor of ' Spencer Bower: Reliance-based estoppel'.

He took appointed as a Deputy High Court judge on the 1st of November 2021 and was assigned to the Chancery division by the Lord Chief Justice. He received his customary Knighthood in March 2022, at Windsor Castle.

References 

High Court judges (England and Wales)
Living people
1964 births